PCIP may refer to:

 Protecting Children from Internet Pornographers Act of 2011, a proposed U.S. Internet legislation
 Nuclear receptor coactivator 3, one symbol for which is pCIP